ETM2 is a gene associated with essential tremor.

References